Cnidarians such as Hydra have become attractive model organisms to study the evolution of immunity. However, despite long-term efforts, stably transgenic animals could not be generated, severely limiting the functional analysis of genes. For analytical purposes, therefore, an important technical breakthrough in the field was the development of a transgenic procedure for generation of stably transgenic lines by embryo microinjection.

Uses 

Hydra polyps are small and transparent which makes it possible to trace single cells in vivo. In addition, transgenic Hydra provide a ready system for generating gain-of-function phenotypes. With the use of transgenes producing dominant-negative versions of proteins, one should be able to obtain loss-of-function phenotypes as well. 
Current technology allows generation of reporter constructs using promoters of various Hydra genes fused to fluorescent proteins.

Since transgenic Hydra lines have become an important tool to dissect molecular mechanisms of development, a “Hydra Transgenic Facility” has been established at the Christian-Albrechts-University of Kiel (Germany).

References 

 Wittlieb J, Khalturin K, Lohmann JU, Anton-Erxleben F and Bosch TCG (2006): Transgenic Hydra allow in vivo tracking of individual stem cells during morphogenesis. Proc. Natl. Acad. Sci. USA 103;16: 6208-6211
 Khalturin K, Anton-Erxleben F, Milde S, Plötz C, Wittlieb J, Hemmrich G and Bosch TCG (2007): Transgenic stem cells in Hydra reveal an early evolutionary origin for key elements controlling self-renewal and differentiation. Developmental Biology, Volume 309, Issue 1, Pages 32–44
 Siebert S, Anton-Erxleben F and Bosch TCG (2008): Cell type complexity in the basal metazoan Hydra is maintained by both stem cell based mechanisms and transdifferentiation. Dev. Biol. 313: 13-24
 Milde S, G Hemmrich, F Anton-Erxleben, K Khalturin, J Wittlieb, and TCG Bosch (2009): Characterization of taxonomically-restricted genes in a phylum-restricted cell type. Genome Biol. 10(1):R8

External links 
Transgenic Hydra facility at the University of Kiel (Germany)

Genetically modified organisms
Molecular biology
Hydridae